Wattle is made by weaving flexible branches around upright stakes to form a woven lattice. The wattle may be made into an individual panel, commonly called a hurdle, or it may be formed into a continuous fence. Wattles also form the basic structure for wattle and daub wall construction, where wattling is daubed with a plaster-like substance to make a weather-resistant wall.

History

Evidence of wattle construction was found at Woodcutts Settlement from the British Iron Age, and the Roman Vitruvius wrote about wattles in his book on architecture, De architectura, but the technique goes back to Neolithic times.

Technique

The construction of wattles starts with the uprights, whether they are set into a frame or placed into the ground. Starting at the bottom, flexible willow shoots, called withies, are woven in and out of the uprights (staves).

Wattle and daub

Wattles forms the basis of wattle and daub, a composite building material used for making walls, in which wattle is daubed with a sticky material usually made of some combination of wet soil, clay, sand, animal dung and straw. Wattle and daub has been used for at least 6,000 years, and is still an important construction material in many parts of the world. The technique is similar to modern lath and plaster, a common building material for wall and ceiling surfaces, in which a series of nailed wooden strips are covered with plaster smoothed into a flat surface. Many historic buildings include wattle and daub construction, mostly as infill panels in timber frame construction.

See also
 Basket weaving
 Lath and plaster

References

External links
 How to make wattle fencing step by step
 37 Amazing Wattle Fences Around The World

Building materials
Materials
Fences
Perimeter security